UFC 58: USA vs. Canada was a mixed martial arts event held by the Ultimate Fighting Championship on March 4, 2006. It was held at the Mandalay Bay Events Center on the Las Vegas Strip in Nevada, and broadcast live on pay-per-view in the United States.

Background
In keeping with the theme of the card, most of the fights featured an American fighter against a Canadian fighter.

Five of the seven Canadian fighters featured, Icho Larenas, Sam Stout, Mark Hominick, Georges St-Pierre, and David Loiseau, were at the time champions in the Canadian TKO Major League MMA promotion.

The show drew a live gate of $1,758,450. The disclosed fighter payroll for UFC 58 was $207,000.

The final scorecard for United States vs. Canada was United States 5, Canada 3.

This event also featured the return of the lightweight division to the UFC, which had been suspended since UFC 49

Results

Reported payout

Georges St. Pierre: $48,000

Rich Franklin: $32,000

Nathan Marquardt: $30,000

BJ Penn: $25,000

Tom Murphy: $10,000

Mike Swick: $10,000

David Loiseau: $9,000

Spencer Fisher: $8,000

Yves Edwards: $8,000

Rob Macdonald: $5,000

Joe Doerksen: $5,000

Jason Lambert: $4,000

Mark Hominick: $4,000

Sam Stout: $4,000

Icho Larenas: $3,000

Steve Vigneault: $2,000

Disclosed Fighter Payroll: $207,000

See also
 Ultimate Fighting Championship
 List of UFC champions
 List of UFC events
 2006 in UFC

References

Sources
Mixed martial arts show results, Mandalay Bay, March 4, 2006 (PDF), Nevada State Athletic Commission, retrieved March 20, 2006
"Franklin Dominates Loiseau; 'Rush' Beats Penn at UFC 58" by Thomas Gerbasi, UFC.tv, March 5, 2006, retrieved March 5, 2006
UFC PPV Buys Explode in 2006
UFC Fighter Salaries for 2006 (includes fighter salaries for UFC 58)

Ultimate Fighting Championship events
2006 in mixed martial arts
Mixed martial arts in Las Vegas
2006 in sports in Nevada